is a district of Minato, Tokyo, Japan.
Shinbashi is a mainly business and entertainment district of central Tokyo, south of Hibiya Park and the Imperial Palace Tokyo.

Education
Minato City Board of Education operates public elementary and junior high schools.

Higashishinbashi 1-2-chōme are zoned to Onarimon Elementary School (御成門小学校) and Onarimon Junior High School (御成門中学校).

References

Districts of Minato, Tokyo